Chuysky is a rural locality (a settlement) in Biysky District, Altai Krai, Russia. The population was 379 as of 2013. There are 9 streets.

Geography 
Chuysky is located 22 km southeast of Biysk (the district's administrative centre) by road. Verkh-Katunskoye is the nearest rural locality.

References 

Rural localities in Biysky District